Emmanuel "Manu" Jonnier (born Dijon, May 31, 1975) is a French cross-country skier and non-commissioned officer who has been competing since 1998. His best finish at the Winter Olympics was fourth in the 50 km event at the 2006 games in Turin.

Jonnier's best finish at the FIS Nordic World Ski Championships was fifth in the 4 × 10 km at Sapporo in 2007. His best individual finish was 20th in the 15 km event both in 2005 and 2007.

Jonnier's best individual World Cup finish was second in a 30 km event in Russia in January 2007. He also finished second in a 15 km Continental Cup event in Austria in 2000.

Cross-country skiing results
All results are sourced from the International Ski Federation (FIS).

Olympic Games

World Championships

World Cup

Season standings

Individual podiums
1 victory – (1 )
5 podiums – (3 , 2 )

Team podiums
 1 victory – (1 ) 
 7 podiums – (7 )

References

External links

1975 births
Cross-country skiers at the 2002 Winter Olympics
Cross-country skiers at the 2006 Winter Olympics
Cross-country skiers at the 2010 Winter Olympics
French male cross-country skiers
Living people
Olympic cross-country skiers of France
Sportspeople from Dijon